Frank Kent Foss (May 9, 1895 – April 5, 1989) was an American pole vaulter. He won a gold medal at the 1920 Summer Olympics, while breaking his own unofficial world record.

Foss grew up in Oak Park, Illinois. After the Olympics, he worked in the meat packing industry, including spending time in Argentina. After returning to the United States, he lived in Hinsdale, Illinois.

Foss graduated from Cornell University in 1917, where he was also a member of the Quill and Dagger society.  He was the IC4A Champion in 1916 after tying for the first the year before.  He was the AAU champion in 1919 and 1920.

See also
World record progression pole vault men

References

External links
 profile

1895 births
1989 deaths
Track and field athletes from Chicago
Athletes (track and field) at the 1920 Summer Olympics
American male pole vaulters
Olympic gold medalists for the United States in track and field
Cornell University alumni
Medalists at the 1920 Summer Olympics
People_from_Hinsdale,_Illinois